Ashwin Kakumanu  is an Indian actor, who is best known for his role as Ganeshan in Venkat Prabhu's Mankatha.

Career
Ashwin initially auditioned for a role in Vinnaithaandi Varuvaayaa. The director, Gautham Vasudev Menon, was close to giving him the role, but Ashwin was noticed by the assistant directors of the film and who recommended him for the role of Arjun, the boyfriend of Sameera Reddy's character in Nadunisi Naaygal. Ashwin Kakumanu later featured in Venkat Prabhu's Mankatha alongside Ajith Kumar, Arjun Sarja and Vaibhav Reddy. Ashwin appeared as a local Dharavi police officer, replacing Ganesh Venkatraman who had pulled out of the film. Ashwin next played a young scientist in A. R. Murugadoss's 7aum Arivu, alongside Suriya and Shruti Haasan. He also appeared in a supporting role in Gautham Menon's Ekk Deewana Tha featuring Prateik Babbar and Amy Jackson.

Ashwin had his first leading role in the 2013 comedy film Idharkuthane Aasaipattai Balakumara and went on to star in the Ilaiyaraaja musical Megha. Among his upcoming projects are Zero, a supernatural thriller that features Ashwin as a social worker, Thiri, directed by Ashok Amritraj, cinematographer-turned-director Siva's next film starring Ajith Kumar, and Thollaikatchi, a "romantic comedy film with a social message" directed by M.Sadiq khan. In Mani Ratnam's Magnum Opus Ponniyin Selvan, he plays the role of Senthan Amuthan.

Filmography

Films 
All films are in Tamil, unless otherwise noted.

Web series and short films

References

External links
 
 

Tamil male actors
Living people
Loyola College, Chennai alumni
1987 births
21st-century Indian male actors